Joel Antonio Reyes Zúñiga (born 8 April 1972) is a Chilean former footballer who played as defensive midfielder. His last professional club was Santiago Morning.

Reyes was the first signing of a Chilean club in bankruptcy after accepting play for Colo-Colo in 2002, year which was champion. He has received five caps with the Chile national team.

He is nicknamed Pelao, which means bonehead in Chilean Spanish.

Club career
Born in Peñaflor, he started his career at Chilean second-tier side Deportes Colchagua in January 1999 aged 26, a very late age for began to play football. However, on mid-year, Reyes was signed by first-tier club Santiago Morning, being the following season runner–up of the 2000 Copa Chile.

In 2002, he joined Chilean powerhouse Colo-Colo and helped the team to win the Torneo Clausura during its bankruptcy period. In 2004, he moved to Universidad de Concepción to play the Copa Libertadores, which was the club's first ever participation in it.

In January 2005, after a season in Concepción, he signed for Unión Española. There he added another honour to his palmares, having reached the Torneo Apertura. In late 2006, he finished his contract with Unión and joined Everton.

On 8 January 2008, after reaching an agreement to terminate his contract with Everton, Reyes signed a contract with Ñublense. An undisputed starter in Chillán–based side, he became the team’s captain and was part of the club’s only one team in play an international tournament after (2008 Copa Sudamericana).

In December 2010, he ended his contract with Ñublense and then joined first-tier Santiago Morning, which was his last club. He left Santiago Morning after its relegation.

Honours

Club
Santiago Morning
 Copa Chile: Runner–up 2000

Colo-Colo
 Primera División de Chile (1): 2002 Clausura

Unión Española
 Primera División de Chile (1): 2005 Apertura

References

External links
 Joel Reyes at Football-Lineups
 
 

1972 births
Living people
Chilean footballers
Colo-Colo footballers
Everton de Viña del Mar footballers
Ñublense footballers
Unión Española footballers
Universidad de Concepción footballers
Santiago Morning footballers
Unión San Felipe footballers
Primera B de Chile players
Chilean Primera División players
Association football midfielders
People from Santiago Metropolitan Region